Rubus sons is a North American species of dewberry in section Verotriviales of the genus Rubus, a member of the rose family. It is found in the southeastern United States from Arkansas and Louisiana to South Carolina.

References

sons
Plants described in 1932
Flora of the Southeastern United States
Flora without expected TNC conservation status